This is a list of Greek football transfers in the summer transfer window 2015 by club. Only transfers of the Superleague are included.

AEK Athens

In:

Out:

Asteras Tripolis

In:

Out:

Atromitos

In:

Out:

Iraklis

In:

Out:

Kalloni

In:

Out:

Levadiakos

In:

Out:

Olympiacos

In:

  

 
 

Out:

Panathinaikos

In:

Out:

Panetolikos

In:

Out:

Panionios

In:

Out:

Panthrakikos

In:

Out:

PAOK

In:

Out:

PAS Giannina

In:

Out:

Platanias

In:

Out:

Skoda Xanthi

In:

Out:

Veria

In:

Out:

.

See also

 2015–16 Superleague Greece

References

External links
 Official site of the Superleague 

Football transfers summer 2015
Trans
2015